Tes Esat is an album by jazz trumpeter Alan Shorter, recorded in Paris in 1970 and released on the French America label.

Reception

AllMusic rated the album 4 stars with its review by Brandon Burke stating, "On this, the last of his leader dates, Shorter's compositions employ relatively vague stutter-step heads and then quickly dive right into free improvisation without looking back".

Track listing
All compositions by Alan Shorter
 "Disposition Part One" - 20:30
 "Disposition Part Two" - 6:00
 "Beast of Bash" - 3:10
 "One Million Squared" - 8:10

Personnel
Alan Shorter - trumpet
Gary Windo - tenor saxophone
Johnny Mbizo Dyani - bass, flute, piano, bells
Rene Augustus - drums, bells

References 

1971 albums
Alan Shorter albums
America Records albums